Van Clevesville is an unincorporated community in Berkeley County, West Virginia, United States. It is located between the communities of Baker Heights and Winebrenners Crossroad.

Unincorporated communities in Berkeley County, West Virginia
Unincorporated communities in West Virginia